American Authors (formerly known as The Blue Pages) is an American rock band originally from Boston, now based in New York City, signed to Island Records. The band consists of lead vocalist and guitarist Zac Barnett, bassist Dave Rublin, and drummer Matt Sanchez. Former member includes guitarist and banjoist James Adam Shelley. They are best known for their hit singles "Believer" and "Best Day of My Life", from their debut album, Oh, What a Life, as well as their top 20 hit "Go Big or Go Home", from their second album, What We Live For.

History

2006–2011: Early years
The members of American Authors met while attending Berklee College of Music in 2006. The quartet spent their first years in Boston recording and performing music under the name The Blue Pages. In May 2010, the band opened for Cash Cash on the Robots in High-Tops tour. In 2010, they relocated to Brooklyn. On December 1, 2010, the Blue Pages independently released their single "Run Back Home" on iTunes.

2012–2015: Name change, debut album
In 2012, the group changed their name to American Authors. In January 2013, the band was signed to Mercury Records. Their debut single, "Believer", garnered attention through alternative rock radio. On March 19, 2013, they released their most successful single to date, "Best Day of My Life".

American Authors released their self-titled debut EP on August 27, 2013. In 2013, the group won Overall Grand Prize in the 18th Annual USA Songwriting Competition with their song "Believer".  

They released their debut studio album, Oh, What a Life, on March 3, 2014, and subsequently ranked at number nine on Billboards chart of Top New Artists for that year. In July 2015, the band was picked as Elvis Duran's Artist of the Month and featured on NBC's Today show, performing the song "Best Day of My Life".

2015–2019: What We Live For, Seasons
From 2015 to 2016, American Authors worked on their second album, What We Live For. The lead single, "Go Big or Go Home", was released on May 18, 2015, a year before the album's publication. On December 11, 2015, the band issued the single "Pride", and "What We Live For" followed on April 1, 2016. The album was released on July 1, 2016. "I'm Born to Run" was issued as the record's fourth and final single in 2017.

American Authors released the single "Deep Water" on May 17, 2018, preceding their third studio album. In December, they announced the record's title, Seasons. Its third single, "Say Amen", came out on November 16, 2018, followed by "Neighborhood" on December 7 and "Stay Around" on January 11, 2019. The song "Bring It on Home" was featured in an official trailer for the documentary film The Biggest Little Farm on January 29, 2019. Seasons was released on February 1, 2019.

2020–2022: Counting Down, covers, and collaborations
On January 17, 2020, American Authors released a new single titled "Microphone". On February 28, they published a song with Seeb, titled "Best I Can". On September 18, 2020, they released the EP Counting Down.

On April 23, 2021, the band announced on Twitter that James Adam Shelley would no longer be part of the band and that American Authors would continue without him.

On June 25, 2021, American Authors released their first song as a trio, "Nice and Easy", which features Mark McGrath of Sugar Ray. They also teamed up with Rob Thomas and Santana for the song "Move", from the latter's most recent album, Blessings and Miracles. On October 29, 2021, they released an original Christmas song called 'Favorite Time of the Year".

In 2022, the band released a cover of "Good 4 U" by Olivia Rodrigo and "Circles" by Post Malone, as well as two Christmas songs, "Christmas Karaoke" and "Sleigh Ride".

2022–present: Best Night of My Life
On September 9, 2022, American Authors released Blind for Love, the first single from their fourth studio album, Best Night of My Life, released on February 10, 2023. They followed it on January 13, 2023, with the single "Best Night of My Life".

In other media
The American Authors song "Hit It" is featured in the EA Sports game FIFA 14. Their song "Best Day of My Life" was used in an MLB Fan Cave commercial and is the title music of Sky Sports News' My Special Day feature. It has also appeared in a television spot for the movie The Secret Life of Walter Mitty, in an episode of the television show The Vampire Diaries, and in the 2013 Boston Red Sox World Series championships. The song was ranked number one on Billboards 2014 Adult Pop Songs chart. The song "Home" was featured in a trailer for the movie This Is Where I Leave You and in a video honoring troops and their families.

American Authors' second single, "Best Day of My Life", was featured in, among other things, a Lowe's television advertisement in the United States, a Hyundai television advertisement in the United Kingdom, an advertisement in South Africa for Castle Lager, and a Telecom New Zealand advertisement. It appears in a trailer for the film Delivery Man, in the Konami video game Pro Evolution Soccer 2015, in the opening sequence for ESPN's 2013 World Series of Poker coverage, in a trailer for Earth to Echo as well as How to Train Your Dragon 2, in the film Humpback Whales, and a trailer for St. Vincent. The track is also featured in the video game Guitar Hero Live. The song won the newly established Sync Music Award at the SESAC Pop Awards 2015. American Authors band members also had cameos in the TV show Bar Rescue.

Festivals and events
The group has appeared at various music festivals and events, including Lollapalooza, SXSW Music Festival, Firefly Music Festival, Reading Festival, Leeds Festival, Bunbury Music Festival, Freakfest, Grammys on the Hill (an awards ceremony honoring artists and legislators who have improved the environment for music creators), BottleRock Napa Valley, Keloorah, Pukkelpop, and Polartec Big Air at Fenway.

Band membersCurrent Zac Barnett – lead vocals, guitar (2006–present)
 Dave Rublin – bass, backing vocals, keyboards (2006–present)
 Matt Sanchez – drums, percussion, backing vocals (2006–present)Former James Adam Shelley – lead guitar, backing vocals, keyboards, banjo, mandolin (2006–2021)

DiscographyStudio albums'''
 Oh, What a Life (2014)
 What We Live For (2016)
 Seasons (2019)
 Best Night of My Life'' (2023)

See also
 List of alternative rock artists
 List of Berklee College of Music alumni
 List of Mercury Records artists

References

External links
 
 December 2014 American Authors interview on Guitar.com

2006 establishments in Massachusetts
Alternative rock groups from Massachusetts
Alternative rock groups from New York (state)
Indie rock musical groups from Massachusetts
Indie rock musical groups from New York (state)
Berklee College of Music alumni
Mercury Records artists
Musical groups established in 2006
Musical groups from Boston
Musical groups from Brooklyn
Musical quartets
American musical trios